Cleveland City Council is the legislative branch of government for the City of Cleveland, Ohio. Its chambers are located at Cleveland City Hall at 601 Lakeside Avenue, across the street from Public Auditorium in Downtown Cleveland. Cleveland City Council members are elected from 17 wards to four-year terms. In Cleveland's mayor–council (strong mayor) form of government, council acts as a check against the power of the city executive, the mayor. Its responsibilities include "monitoring city departments, approving budgets, and enacting legislation to improve the quality of life [for the citizens of the city]."

The current President of Council is Blaine Griffin. The council Majority Leader is Kerry McCormack, and the Majority Whip is Jasmin Santana. Patricia Britt serves as the Clerk of Council.

History
The structure and membership of City Council have fluctuated throughout Cleveland's history. Established in 1802, it initially included three trustees, and when Cleveland was incorporated as a city in 1836, it had three aldermen. After the annexation of Ohio City in 1854, "the revised city council expanded to 11 wards, with 2 trustees elected from each," or 22 representatives in total. By 1885, the city's legislature had grown to 50 representatives. Cleveland's 1892 Federal Plan, which strengthened the powers of the mayor, reduced the size of council to 20 members, but after the plan was ruled unconstitutional by the Supreme Court of Ohio in 1902, council membership grew again to 32.

After gaining municipal home rule from the state in 1912, Cleveland's city government, led by Mayor Newton D. Baker, drafted a new municipal charter. In developing the charter, the size of council proved to be the most contentious issue. According to the Encyclopedia of Cleveland History, "those advocating a small council elected at large maintained that it would be more efficient, less expensive and would eliminate local machine corruption. Those who favored a large council elected by ward considered it more democratic, since it made councilmen answerable to their constituents."

The final charter adopted in 1913 introduced a system with 26 wards each represented by a single council member. Due to the city's continued expansion, council grew to 33 members by 1923, making it "second in size only to Chicago's 50-member council." In the 1920s, during the brief council–manager experiment, the number of council members was reduced to 25. When the mayor–council system was restored in 1931, the city had 33 council members again.

In November 1981, as part of Mayor George Voinovich's effort to streamline city government, Cleveland voters approved reducing council to 21 members. In November 2008, during the tenure of Mayor Frank G. Jackson, Cleveland voters passed a charter amendment linking the size of City Council to the city's population. City Council approved a redistricting plan in March 2009, reducing the number of wards to 19 at the start of the 2010–2013 term. Thereafter, the number of wards was tied to the population identified in the decennial United States Census.

Population decreases identified in the 2010 Census resulted in the elimination of two wards, reducing the number of members to 17. In March 2013, City Council approved new ward boundaries that went into effect in January 2014. Council voted to amend the boundaries on  April 17, 2013.

Current council
The members of Cleveland City Council - all from the Democratic Party -  are listed below in the order of the ward they serve.

Committees

See also
Mayor of Cleveland
Cuyahoga County Council

References

External links
Cleveland City Council (official website)
Community Fact Sheets: Cleveland Neighborhoods and Wards, The Center for Community Solutions, Cleveland
Current Cleveland City Ward Maps, Northern Ohio Data and Information Service (NODIS), Levin College of Urban Affairs (Cleveland State University)
Mary Ellen Kollar, Cleveland City Government, with historical ward maps of Cleveland, The Encyclopedia of Cleveland History (Case Western Reserve University)

Government of Cleveland
Ohio city councils
1802 establishments in the Northwest Territory